Surk (also Romanized as Sūrk; also known as Surkh) is a village in Dastgerd Rural District, in the Central District of Kiar County, Chaharmahal and Bakhtiari Province, Iran. At the 2006 census, its population was 1,251, in 276 families. The village is populated by Lurs.

References 

Populated places in Kiar County
Luri settlements in Chaharmahal and Bakhtiari Province